Scott Allen Miller (also known as Scotto) has worked in radio since 1992, doing stints as a disc jockey, a producer, and a talk radio host in such places as Kansas City, Tulsa, Los Angeles, and Albany, New York. He was most recently the morning drive host and program director at WROW in Albany.

In 2008, Miller earned a mention in Talkers Magazine. Although he did not make the cut for inclusion in the magazine's “Heavy Hundred” list, he was listed in the unranked 101 to 250 category.

The website VisitingNewEngland.com called him "for the most part, a fair and balanced talk show host with a deeply developed thought process and a slight chip-on-the-shoulder attitude."  Politically, Miller reportedly leans libertarian but differs with some of the typical Libertarian Party positions on matters of criminal justice, and national defense.

Biography 
Miller was born on October 9, 1970 in Muncie, Indiana. After his father died in 1986, he moved from Indiana to live with his mother in New Jersey. He attended Howell High School with future CBS sportscaster Bonnie Bernstein, who was featured on his radio show several times, as well as filmmaker Brian Jude.

Miller dropped out of Trenton State College, moved to western Kansas and began his radio career in March 1992 at 1420 AM KULY in Ulysses, Kansas. He worked at High Plains Public Radio in Garden City, Kansas before enrolling
at Kansas State University in Manhattan, Kansas, where he wrote columns for the school's daily newspaper, K-State Collegian.

Radio career 
After earning a bachelor of arts in social science in 1996, Miller moved to Kansas City to work as a producer for then-sister stations AM 980 KMBZ and AM 810 KCMO. He moved to Los Angeles in 1998 to produce The John & Ken Show, which at the time was syndicated nationwide. He also worked as a phone screener for Stephanie Miller before moving back to Kansas City.

In 2000, Miller hosted his first talk radio show at AM 580 WIBW in Topeka, Kansas. The following year, Miller began hosting a weekend show and producing the weekday morning show on AM 710 KCMO. In the spring of 2002, Miller was named the host of a morning drive radio talk show in Tulsa, Oklahoma but, according to Miller, was fired after just a few weeks "for not being conservative enough." By the end of 2002, Miller was hosting The Scotto Show in afternoon drive on AM 810 WGY in Albany, New York. In the days after the start of the Iraq War, Miller promoted and spoke at a rally to show support for military servicemen and their families that drew 10,000 people to upstate New York, according to the Boston Globe.

Miller began airing on Boston's WRKO in September 2003, replacing morning show co-host John "Ozone" Osterlind. He shared hosting duties with Peter Blute, a Republican career politician who had represented Massachusetts' Third District in Congress and directed Massport before joining WRKO in 1999. In May 2004 Miller wrote an op-ed article in the Boston Globe critical of the Federal Communications Commission's crackdown on broadcast indecency.

After Blute departed WRKO in September 2005 to pursue other interests, WRKO launched Boston This Morning with Miller as its sole host. While Blute and Scotto discussed a few select issues of the day in depth with guests and callers, Boston This Morning covered a wider range of stories through newsmaker interviews and breaking news coverage but with less time devoted to Miller's commentaries and interaction with callers. According to the Boston Herald, WRKO designed Boston This Morning to be more competitive with all-news market leader AM 1030 WBZ, but Boston Phoenix media critic Mark Jurkowitz has lamented that WRKO has transformed the freewheeling and funny Scotto into the much more serious and sober—and newsmanly—Scott Allen Miller.

In the spring of 2006 the program was renamed The Scott Allen Miller Show and changed once again to a more relaxed, caller-friendly format without the frequent traffic and weather breaks, interviews with a variety of guests, and scarce audience participation of Boston This Morning. The Scott Allen Miller Show maintained a strong news presence through Miller's  interviews with newsmakers and updates from WRKO's news anchors.

Miller was fired from WRKO  in 2007., to be replaced by former Massachusetts Speaker of the House Tom Finneran. Miller's last day on the station was February 9.

Miller returned to Albany in October 2007 to replace Paul Vandenburgh on WROW, beginning on October 22. Miller departed WROW in 2008, hosting his final show on August 29.

Since his departure from WRKO he has occasionally filled in for John Gibson on his Fox News Radio show as well as for Jeff Bolton and Jon David Wells on 570 KLIF in the Dallas/Fort Worth metroplex. Scott also filled in for Spencer Hughes on Fox Across America, a Fox News Radio show.

Personal life 
As a child, Miller attended a Pentecostal church and occasionally attended services at Trinity Church in Boston with his wife, but long insisted he was an agnostic. However, on January 12, 2007 Miller announced he had converted to Orthodox Christianity; He and his daughters were baptized into the faith on Easter of that year, with his wife Chrismated on Easter of the following year. He said that his religious conversion began when he attended a service at an Orthodox church in South Boston with a friend more than a year before. He further went on to say that his faith is helping him be optimistic about his future after being released from his show on WRKO.  He is an avid reader of Orthodox Theological literature, including writings of the Church Fathers, and will discuss them at length with those who show interest.

Miller has a blog called the Scotto Bloggo which he occasionally updates, though less frequently than in the past.

According to the John Gibson radio program on August 15, 2011, Miller will not be hosting the radio program anymore because he will be working on become a priest.

References

External links
 The Scotto Bloggo
 

American libertarians
American talk radio hosts
Radio personalities from Boston
Radio personalities from New Jersey
Radio personalities from New York City
Howell High School (New Jersey) alumni
People from Monmouth County, New Jersey
People from Muncie, Indiana
1970 births
Living people